The Skerries Lighthouse  was first lit on the highest point of the largest island in The Skerries, Isle of Anglesey after 1716. A patent for the lighthouse was subsequently obtained in 1824. The builder was William Trench, who lost his son off the rocks and died in debt in 1725. He is said to have originally been allowed a pension from the Post Office, rather than payment from shipping tolls. An act of 1730 allowed his son-in-law, Sutton Morgan, to increase the dues charged for shipping and confirmed the patent on the light to Morgan's heirs forever.

History
It was rebuilt around 1759 by Morgan's heirs for about £3,000. It was lit by a coal brazier on top of the tower. The lantern was glazed all around with square panes and covered by a cupola.

Trinity House took over operation of the lighthouse under an enabling act of 1836, but not without a fight from the original owners, who wanted to protect their investment from a low takeover price. The final price paid was a little over £440,000 (four hundred and forty thousand Pounds Sterling) a reflection of the huge revenues that were accruing to the owners via shipping dues of 1d (one "old" penny, 1/12th of a shilling, 1/240th of a Pound Sterling) per ton from every commercial vessel over 5 tons entering Liverpool. Foreign ships and ships sailing in from foreign ports were liable to double this rate. The dues were payable irrespective of whether or not the vessel actually passed within the range of the light or the time of passing.

The lighthouse was lavishly restored by James Walker, exhibiting two of his characteristics: a decrease in diameter and a solid parapet (as seen at his Trwyn Du Lighthouse). A new cast-iron lantern,  in diameter, was glazed with square panes around a dioptric light with mirrors, later replaced by a lens. On the north side of the tower there is a former external doorway exhibiting the Trinity House coat of arms, which now leads to the engine room.

The light was automated in 1987 and is now controlled from Holyhead.

Nearby are castellated dwellings having cobbled yards and entrance stairs, along with symmetrically sited privies, a garden, a stone bridge connecting two islets, and a unique stone well-head building. An axial corridor leads from the dwellings to the lighthouse tower's base. The early date of the lighthouse keepers’ cottages makes the buildings of considerable interest. For a number of summers, they have been used by wardens working for the Royal Society for the Protection of Birds.

See also

List of lighthouses in Wales
Grade II* listed buildings in Anglesey

References

Sources
Hague, D. B., Lighthouses of Wales: Their Architecture and Archaeology, ed. S. Hughes (Royal Commission on the Ancient and Historical Monuments of Wales, 1994)

External links

 Trinity House

Lighthouses completed in 1759
Lighthouses completed in 1904
Lighthouses in Anglesey
1759 establishments in Great Britain
1904 establishments in Wales
Grade II* listed lighthouses
Grade II* listed buildings in Anglesey